Christina Marie Katrina Julien (born 6 May 1988 in Cornwall, Ontario) is a Canadian women's soccer striker who plays for German club 1. FC Köln and the Canada women's national soccer team. She has played in the 2011 FIFA Women's World Cup and won a gold medal at the 2011 Pan American Games. Julien was named in the 2012 Olympic squad as an alternate player.

Club career
Julien joined FF USV Jena for the 2014 season, and at the end of the season she left the club and joined 1. FC Köln.

International goals

References

External links

1988 births
Women's association football forwards
Canada women's international soccer players
Canadian expatriate women's soccer players
Canadian women's soccer players
Canadian expatriate sportspeople in Germany
Damallsvenskan players
Expatriate women's footballers in Germany
Expatriate women's footballers in Russia
Expatriate women's footballers in Sweden
Expatriate women's soccer players in Australia
Living people
Sportspeople from Cornwall, Ontario
Perth Glory FC (A-League Women) players
WFC Rossiyanka players
FF USV Jena players
Jitex BK players
Pan American Games gold medalists for Canada
Pan American Games medalists in football
1. FC Köln (women) players
Footballers at the 2011 Pan American Games
2011 FIFA Women's World Cup players
Medalists at the 2011 Pan American Games
21st-century Canadian women
Ottawa Fury (women) players
USL W-League (1995–2015) players
Laval Comets players